The 6th edition of Miss Diva took place on 31 August 2018. Top 19 contestants selected from all over the country competed in the pageant, who were mentored by Miss Universe 2000, Lara Dutta. At the end of the event, Miss Universe India 2017, Shraddha Shashidhar   crowned Nehal Chudasama as her successor. She represented India at the 67th Miss Universe 2018 pageant held in Bangkok, Thailand on 16 December 2018. At the same event, Aditi Hundia was crowned as Miss Diva - Supranational 2018 and Roshni Sheoran was crowned as Runner-up. Miss Universe 2017, Demi-Leigh Nel-Peters was a member of the jury. Miss Supranational 2017, Jenny Kim also graced the event. This was also the first miss diva pageant in which the finale was telecasted on the same day.

Final results
Color keys

Special Awards

Judges
Lara Dutta - Miss Universe 2000 & Bollywood Actress
Demi-Leigh Nel-Peters - Miss Universe 2017 from South Africa
Neha Dhupia
Shilpa Shetty
Sushant Singh Rajput
Faluguni Peacock - Designer
Shane Peacock - Designer

Contestants
The following are the contestants participated in the Miss Diva 2018:
Color key

Crossovers and returnees
Miss Diva
2021: Aishwarya Kamal
2019: Shefali Sood Miss Supranational India
2017: Elisha Mayor

Femina Miss India

2017: Aditi Hundia (Top 15)
2017: Shefali Sood (Top 6)
Femina Miss India Maharashtra
2018: Apurva Chavan (Top 3)
Femina Miss India Kerala
2017: Hannah Reji Koshy (Top 3)
Femina Miss India Punjab
2018: Surina Jaidka (Top 3)
Femina Miss India Gujarat
2018: Nehal Chudasama (Top 3)

Notes

References

2018 beauty pageants
August 2018 events in India
Miss Diva